Enaxon Siddiqova (28 August 1954 – 13 January 2023) was an Uzbek poet and politician. She served in the Senate from 2015 to 2023.

Siddiqova died in Fergana on 13 January 2023, at the age of 68.

References

1954 births
2023 deaths
Uzbekistani poets
21st-century Uzbekistani women politicians
Members of the Supreme Assembly (Uzbekistan)
People from Fergana Region